Alto Alegre may refer to one of the following Brazilian cities:

 Alto Alegre, Rio Grande do Sul
 Alto Alegre, Roraima
 Alto Alegre, São Paulo

See also